Manufacturing process management (MPM) is a collection of technologies and methods used to define how products are to be manufactured. MPM differs from ERP/MRP which is used to plan the ordering of materials and other resources, set manufacturing schedules, and compile cost data.

A cornerstone of MPM is the central repository for the integration of all these tools and activities aids in the exploration of alternative production line scenarios; making assembly lines more efficient with the aim of reduced lead time to product launch, shorter product times and reduced work in progress (WIP) inventories as well as allowing rapid response to product or product changes.

 Production process planning
 Manufacturing concept planning
 Factory layout planning and analysis
 work flow simulation.
 walk-path assembly planning
 plant design optimization
 Mixed model line balancing.
 Workloads on multiple stations.
 Process simulation tools e.g. die press lines, manufacturing lines
 Ergonomic simulation and assessment of production assembly tasks
 Resource planning
 Computer-aided manufacturing (CAM)
 Numerical control CNC
 Direct numerical control (DNC)
 Tooling/equipment/fixtures development
 Tooling and Robot work-cell setup and offline programming (OLP)
 Generation of shop floor work instructions
 Time and cost estimates
 ABC – Manufacturing activity-based costing
 Outline of industrial organization
 Quality computer-aided quality assurance (CAQ)
 Failure mode and effects analysis (FMEA)
 Statistical process control (SPC)
 Computer aided inspection with coordinate-measuring machine (CMM)
 Tolerance stack-up analysis using PMI models.
 Success measurements
 Overall equipment effectiveness (OEE),
 Communication with other systems
 Enterprise resource planning (ERP)
 Manufacturing operations management (MOM)
 Product data management (PDM)
 SCADA (supervisory control and data acquisition) real time process monitoring and control
 Human–machine interface (HMI) (or man-machine interface (MMI))
 Distributed control system (DCS)

See also
 List of production topics
 Process management
 Quality management system processes

References

Further reading
 Materials and Manufacturing Processes,  (electronic)  (paper), Taylor & Francis

Product lifecycle management

Management by type